Gayan Chand is a Pakistani politician who has been a member of Senate of Pakistan. since March 2015.

Education

He holds a degree of Bachelor of Engineering which he received from Sindh Agriculture University in 1989. He was the second Dalit to be elected on general seat as senator.

Political career
He was elected to the Senate of Pakistan as a candidate of Pakistan Peoples Party in 2015 Pakistani Senate election.

References

Living people
Pakistani senators (14th Parliament)
Pakistan People's Party politicians
Pakistani Hindus
Thari people
People from Tharparkar District
Year of birth missing (living people)